Jane Dulo (October 13, 1917 – May 22, 1994) was an American actress and comedian. 

Dulo was born Berniece Dewlow, the elder daughter of Lawrence and Nettie Dewlow, she began her career at the age of ten performing in vaudeville. Her father was a Latvian Jew and her mother was of Lithuanian Jewish descent.

When she was a child actress, she used Dulo as a stage name. When she was older, an agent in New York had her change her name to Jane Dillon, which she used  in night clubs in Baltimore and New York. However, when she appeared in Philadelphia in the musical Are You With It? a radio commentator named Jane Dillon in Bridgeport, Connecticut, threatened to sue her. Then she resumed using Dulo.

In 1964, Dulo joined the cast of The Jack Benny Program in a recurring role as Benny's cook. She had a recurring comedic role in the "Sha Na Na" TV series. Dulo also appeared in Hey, Jeannie!, The Phil Silvers Show, The Joey Bishop Show, McHale's Navy (in a recurring role as nurse Molly in 1962-1965), The Dick Van Dyke Show, The Man from UNCLE (The Adriatic Express Affair), I Dream of Jeannie, Get Smart (in a recurring role as agent 99's mother starting in the fourth season), Leave It To Beaver, The Andy Griffith Show, Emergency!, Gunsmoke, Medical Center, The Odd Couple, The Hudson Brothers, That Girl, Welcome Back, Kotter,  The Golden Girls, Razzle Dazzle Show and Gimme a Break!, and others.

She appeared in The Phil Silvers Show episode Bilko's Grand Hotel.

Death
She died at Cedar-Sinai Hospital in Los Angeles following heart surgery at age 76. She never married.

Filmography

References

External links
 

1917 births
1994 deaths
20th-century American actresses
American film actresses
American television actresses
Jewish American actresses
American people of Latvian-Jewish descent
American people of Lithuanian-Jewish descent
Actresses from Baltimore
Comedians from Maryland
20th-century American Jews